Andrew Kerr OAM (born 2 April 1954) is an Australian former water polo player who competed in the 1976 Summer Olympics, the 1980 Summer Olympics, the 1984 Summer Olympics, and the 1988 Summer Olympics.

Family 
Andrew Kerr has 3 siblings, brothers Peter, Bill and sister Cecilia. His mother was Petronella Lynch (d. 2004) from Mildura. His father was Henry 'Harry' Kerr (c. 1921-July 2013),  a retail clerk who reached the rank of Flight Lieutenant during service with the Royal Australian Air Force in World War 2. 'Harry' flew Kittyhawks with No. 76 Squadron RAAF and was also a flight instructor.

Honours 
In 2009, Kerr was inducted into the Water Polo Australia Hall of Fame. He was awarded the Medal of the Order of Australia in the 2014 New Year's Day honours list.

See also
 Australia men's Olympic water polo team records and statistics
 List of players who have appeared in multiple men's Olympic water polo tournaments

References

External links
 

1954 births
Living people
Australian male water polo players
Olympic water polo players of Australia
Water polo players at the 1976 Summer Olympics
Water polo players at the 1980 Summer Olympics
Water polo players at the 1984 Summer Olympics
Water polo players at the 1988 Summer Olympics
Recipients of the Medal of the Order of Australia
20th-century Australian people